Holmesdale may refer to:

Baron Amherst of Holmesdale in the County of Kent
Vale of Holmesdale, in Surrey and Kent, England
Holmesdale Building Society, founded in Reigate, Surrey 
The Holmesdale School in Snodland, Kent
Holmesdale, Derbyshire, England